Peter Pope may refer to:

 Peter Pope (Canadian politician) (1933–2007), Canadian businessman and politician
 Peter Pope (MP), in 1386 MP for Rochester
 Peter Pope (composer) (1917–1991), British composer

See also
Pope Peter (disambiguation)